Lóránt Oláh (born 23 November 1979) is a Serbian-born Hungarian former professional footballer who played as a striker.

Career
After playing for Solunac Karađorđevo, Oláh moved to Hungary and joined Nemzeti Bajnokság I club Szeged in the summer of 1999. He subsequently returned to FR Yugoslavia and played for Vojvodina in the latter part of the 1999–2000 season. After spending two years at Solunac Karađorđevo, Oláh moved to Hungary for the second time and signed with Szolnok in the summer of 2002. He spent one season at the club, before switching to Kaposvár and helping them win promotion to the top flight in 2004. Over the following four seasons (2004–2008), Oláh amassed 109 appearances and scored 49 goals for the side. He subsequently signed with fellow Nemzeti Bajnokság I club Debrecen, helping them win the title in the 2008–09 season. In the 2010 winter transfer window, Oláh returned to his former club Kaposvár.

Statistics

Honours
Debrecen
 Nemzeti Bajnokság I: 2008–09
Budafok
 Nemzeti Bajnokság III: 2016–17

References

External links

 
 
 

Association football forwards
Budafoki LC footballers
Debreceni VSC players
Ferencvárosi TC footballers
First League of Serbia and Montenegro players
FK Vojvodina players
Hungarian footballers
Kaposvári Rákóczi FC players
Kozármisleny SE footballers
Nemzeti Bajnokság I players
Nemzeti Bajnokság II players
People from Ada, Serbia
Serbia and Montenegro footballers
Serbian footballers
Serbian people of Hungarian descent
Szeged-Csanád Grosics Akadémia footballers
Szeged LC footballers
Szolnoki MÁV FC footballers
1979 births
Living people